"Smokin" Joe Kilroy (born 21 June 1960) is an Australian former rugby league footballer who played in the 1980s and 1990s. A Queensland State of Origin representative /, he played club football in the Brisbane Rugby League Premiership with Brothers and Northern Suburbs club and in the Sydney Rugby League Premiership with the Brisbane Broncos.

He also played full-back in the Halifax team which surprised everyone in English rugby league by winning the Rugby Football League Championship in 1985–86 under player-coach Chris Anderson.

Playing career
Early in his football career Joe Kilroy played for Brisbane's Northern Suburbs club, with a man-of-the-match performance in their win over Souths in the 1980 Brisbane Rugby League grand final.  He later played for Brothers, playing for them in the 1987 BRL grand final and scoring two tries. His big year however was 1988, when he played in the first ever Brisbane Broncos match as well as the State of Origin. He was nicknamed 'Smokin' Joe, because of his great speed on the football field.

In 1983 Kilroy was ranked as the world's best fullback, but in 1989 he was sent to jail for three years on drug-related charges. On his release in 1991, he played one game for the Broncos.

Post playing
Kilroy has since been named in the 4 BC Brisbane Rugby League's Team of the 80s. In 2008 he was named on the wing of an all-time greatest Norths Devils team. Kilroy was runner-up to Tony Obst for the Brisbane Rugby League Rothman's Medal in 1980.

References

External links

Joe Kilroy at yesterdayshero.com.au
1980 Brisbane Rugby League Grand Final at .queensland.rleague.com
4BC Brisbane Rugby League Team of the 80s at qrl.com.au
Queensland representatives at qrl.com.au

1960 births
Living people
Australian rugby league players
Australian expatriate sportspeople in England
Brisbane Broncos players
Brisbane rugby league team players
Halifax R.L.F.C. players
Indigenous Australian rugby league players
Norths Devils players
Past Brothers players
Queensland Rugby League State of Origin players
Rugby league players from Maryborough, Queensland
Rugby league wingers